Ernest Christopher Dowson (2 August 186723 February 1900) was an English poet, novelist, and short-story writer who is often associated with the Decadent movement.

Biography
Ernest Dowson was born in Lee, then in Kent, in 1867. His great-uncle was Alfred Domett, a Prime Minister of New Zealand. Dowson attended The Queen's College, Oxford, but left in March 1888 without obtaining a degree.

In November 1888 Dowson started work at Dowson & Son, his father's dry-docking business in Limehouse, East London. He led an active social life, carousing with medical students and law pupils, visiting music halls, and taking the performers to dinner.

Dowson was a member of the Rhymers' Club, and a contributor to literary magazines such as The Yellow Book and The Savoy. He collaborated with Arthur Moore on two unsuccessful novels, worked on a novel of his own, Madame de Viole, and wrote reviews for The Critic. Later in his career Dowson became a translator of French fiction, including novels by Balzac and the Goncourt brothers, and Les Liaisons dangereuses by Choderlos de Laclos.

In 1889 Dowson became infatuated with an 11-year-old girl, Adelaide "Missie" Foltinowicz, the daughter of a Polish restaurant-owner. In 1892 Dowson converted to Roman Catholicism and in 1893 he proposed to Foltinowicz, who was then aged 15. She rejected his proposal and later married a tailor.

In August 1894 Dowson's father, suffering from tuberculosis, died of an overdose of chloral hydrate. In February 1895 his mother, who also had tuberculosis, hanged herself. Soon after her death Dowson's health began to decline rapidly. Leonard Smithers gave Dowson an allowance to live in France and make translations for him. However, in 1897 Dowson returned to London to live with the Foltinowicz family.
 
In 1899 Robert Sherard found Dowson almost penniless in a wine bar. Sherard took him to his cottage in Catford, where Dowson spent his last six weeks.

On 23 February 1900 Dowson died in Catford at the age of 32. He was interred in the Roman Catholic section of Brockley and Ladywell Cemeteries in London.

Works

Dowson is best remembered for three phrases from his poems:

 "Days of wine and roses", from the poem "Vitae Summa Brevis"
 "Gone with the wind", from the poem ''Non Sum Qualis eram Bonae Sub Regno Cynarae"
 "I have been faithful ... in my fashion", from "Cynarae"

J. P. Miller called a television play Days of Wine and Roses (1958) and the film of the same title was based on the play. The phrase also inspired the song "Days of Wine and Roses".

Margaret Mitchell, touched by the "far away, faintly sad sound I wanted" in the first line of the third stanza of "Cynarae", chose the line as the title of her novel Gone with the Wind.

"Cynarae" is also the source of the phrase "I have been faithful ... in my fashion", as in the title of the film Faithful in My Fashion (1946). Cole Porter paraphrased Dowson in the song "Always True to You in My Fashion" in the musical Kiss Me, Kate. Morrissey uses the lines, "In my own strange way,/I've always been true to you./In my own sick way,/I'll always stay true to you" in the song "Speedway" on the album Vauxhall & I.

According to the Oxford English Dictionary, Dowson provides the earliest recorded use of the word "soccer" in written language, although he spelled it "socca".

Dowson's prose works include the short stories collected as Dilemmas (1895), and the two novels A Comedy of Masks (1893) and Adrian Rome (each co-written with Arthur Moore).

"Cynarae" was first published in The Second Book of the Rhymer's Club in 1894, and was noticed by Richard Le Gallienne in his "Wanderings in Bookland" column in The Idler, Volume 9.

Books
 A Comedy of Masks: A Novel (1893) With Arthur Moore.
 Dilemmas, Stories and Studies in Sentiment (1895)
 Verses (1896)
 The Pierrot of the Minute: A Dramatic Phantasy in One Act (1897)
 Decorations in Verse and Prose (1899)
 Adrian Rome (1899), with Arthur Moore
 Cynara: A Little Book of Verse (1907)
 Studies in Sentiment (1915)
 The Poems and Prose of Ernest Dowson, with a Memoir by Arthur Symons (1919)
 Letters of Ernest Dowson (1968)
 Collected Shorter Fiction (2003)

Legacy

 In a letter to Leonard Smithers, Oscar Wilde wrote of the death of Dowson: "Poor wounded wonderful fellow that he was, a tragic reproduction of all tragic poetry, like a symbol, or a scene. I hope bay leaves will be laid on his tomb, and rue and myrtle too, for he knew what love is."
 Arthur Moore wrote several comic novels about the young adult duo of Anthony "Tony" Wilder and Paul Morrow. Tony is based on Dowson, while Paul is based on Moore. Moore's novel The Eyes of Light is mentioned by E. Nesbit in her novel The Phoenix and the Carpet. 
 In a memoir included in Poems and Prose of Ernest Dowson (1919) Arthur Symons describes Dowson as "a man who was undoubtedly a man of genius ... There never was a poet to whom verse came more naturally. ... He had the pure lyric gift, unweighed or unballasted by any other quality of mind or emotion."
 Frederick Delius set several of Dowson's poems to music in his Songs of Sunset and Cynara.
 John Ireland set Dowson's poem "I Was Not Sorrowful (Spleen)" from Verses (1896) in his 1912 song cycle Songs of a Wayfarer.
 T. E. Lawrence quotes from Dowson's poem "Impenitentia Ultima" in Seven Pillars of Wisdom (Chapter 54).
 Eugene O"Neill quotes from both "Vitae Summa Brevis" and "Cynarae" in his play Long Day's Journey into Night (1941).
 Dowson's poem "Days of Wine and Roses" is recited in the TV series The Durrells in Corfu (Season 2, episode 4).
 In anticipation of the anniversary of Dowson's birth on 2 August 2010 his grave, which had fallen derelict and been vandalised, was restored. The unveiling and memorial service were publicised in the South London Press, on BBC Radio 4 and in the Times Literary Supplement, and dozens of people paid tribute to the poet 110 years after his death.
 Jack London quotes from Dowsons poem "Impenitentia Ultima" in The Sea-Wolf (Chapter XXVI)

Notes

References
Citations

Sources

 Anon (1968) "Ernest Dowson", in Essays and Reviews from the Times Literary Supplement 1967, London: Oxford University Press, pp. 55–63. Originally published in the Times Literary Supplement, 2 November 1967.

Plarr,Victor (1914). Ernest Dowson 1888-1897: Reminiscences, Unpublished Letters and Marginalia, with a bibliography compiled by H. Guy Harrison. New York: Laurence J. Gomme.
 Richards, Bernard (n.d.). "Dowson, Ernest Christopher (1867–1900), poet", in Oxford Dictionary of National Biography online, retrieved 30 April 2014.

Further reading
Primary works (modern scholarly editions)
 The Stories of Ernest Dowson, ed. by Mark Longaker (Philadelphia: University of Pennsylvania Press, 1947)
 The Poems of Ernest Dowson, ed. by Mark Longaker (Philadelphia: University of Pennsylvania Press, 1962)
 The Letters of Ernest Dowson, ed. by Desmond Flower and Henry Maas (London: Cassell, 1967)
 The Poetry of Ernest Dowson, ed. by Desmond Flower (Cranbury, NJ: Fairleigh Dickinson University Press, 1970)
 The Pierrot of the Minute, restored edition with Aubrey Beardsley's illustrations (CreateSpace, 2012)
 Le Pierrot de la Minute, bilingual illustrated edition with French translation by Philippe Baudry (CreateSpace, 2012)

Biographies
 Jad Adams, Madder Music, Stronger Wine: The Life of Ernest Dowson, Poet and Decadent (London: I.B. Tauris & Co., 2000)
 Mark Longaker, Ernest Dowson: A Biography (Philadelphia: University of Pennsylvania Press, 1945)
 Henry Maas, Ernest Dowson: Poetry and Love in the 1890s (London: Greenwich Exchange, 2009)

Critical Studies on Dowson and the 1890s
 Elisa Bizzotto, La mano e l'anima. Il ritratto immaginario fin de siècle (Milano: Cisalpino, 2001)
 Jean-Jacques Chardin, Ernest Dowson et la crise fin de siècle anglaise (Paris: Editions Messene, 1995)
 Linda Dowling, Language and Decadence in the Victorian Fin de Siècle (Princeton: Princeton University Press, 1986)
 B. Ifor Evans, English Poetry in the Later Nineteenth Century (London: Methuen, 1966)
 Ian Fletcher, Decadence and the 1890s (London: Edward Arnold, 1979)
 Jessica Gossling and Alice Condé (eds), In Cynara’s Shadow: Collected Essays on Ernest Dowson (Bern, Switzerland: Peter Lang UK, 2019)
 Graham Hough, The Last Romantics (London: Duckworth, 1949)
 Holbrook Jackson, The Eighteen Nineties (London: Jonathan Cape, 1927)
 Agostino Lombardo, La poesia inglese dall'estetismo al simbolismo (Roma: Edizioni di Storia e Letteratura, 1950)
 Franco Marucci, Storia della letteratura inglese dal 1870 al 1921 (Firenze: Le Lettere, 2006)
 
 Murray G. H. Pittock, Spectrum of Decadence: The Literature of the 1890s (London: Routledge, 1993)
 Mario Praz, La carne, la morte e il diavolo nella letteratura romantica (Firenze: Sansoni, 1976)
 Bernard Richards, English Poetry of the Victorian Period (London: Longman, 1988)
 Thomas Burnett Swann, Ernest Dowson (New York: Twayne, 1964)
 Arthur Symons, The Memoirs of Arthur Symons, ed. by Karl Beckson (University Park: Pennsylvania State University Press, 1977)
 William Butler Yeats, Autobiographies (London: Macmillan, 1955)

External links

 Poems (1900)
 A few of Dowson's poems, through the University of Toronto
 Arthur Symons's memoir of Dowson
 
 
 
 "Dowson, Schoenberg and the Birth of Modernism" in Horizon Review

 Text of "Days of Wine and Roses"

1867 births
1900 deaths
Alumni of The Queen's College, Oxford
English Roman Catholics
English Catholic poets
Converts to Roman Catholicism
People from Lee, London
Roman Catholic writers
English male poets
19th-century English poets
19th-century English male writers
Burials at Brockley and Ladywell Cemeteries
French–English translators
19th-century translators